Shafkat Saeed (born 1 June 1949) is a career diplomat and formerly the Pakistani Ambassador to France from 2009–2013, as well as to Monaco, Belgium, Luxembourg, Kuwait, South Africa, and Iran.

Career
Saeed joined the foreign service in 1973 and has served in a number of places including Paris (1976–1978), Bern (1978–1983) and  Abu Dhabi (1991–1994).

South Africa
Saeed served as High Commissioner from 1997 to 2001.

Kuwait
He was Pakistan's ambassador between 2001 and 2003.

Iran
He was appointed ambassador to Tehran in 2006  and stayed until 2008.

France

References

1949 births
Ambassadors of Pakistan to Belgium
Ambassadors of Pakistan to France
Ambassadors of Pakistan to Iran
Ambassadors of Pakistan to Kuwait
Ambassadors of Pakistan to Luxembourg
Ambassadors of Pakistan to Monaco
High Commissioners of Pakistan to South Africa
Living people